Centerton may refer to any of the following locations in the United States:
Centerton, Arkansas
Centerton, Indiana
Centerton, Burlington County, New Jersey
Centerton, Salem County, New Jersey
Centerton, Ohio
Elsewhere
Centerton, Eastern Cape, an area within the town of Hankey, South Africa

Other uses
Centerton (microprocessor) is an Intel Atom-based x86 microprocessor, marketed as the Atom S1200 series of CPUs

See also
Centertown (disambiguation)